The 2005 Campionato Italiano Superturismo season was the fourth season of the Italian Superturismo Championship since its recreation in 2002. It was won by well-known former Formula One and CART driver Alessandro Zanardi.

Teams and drivers

Race calendar

 Rounds 1–4 were run together with the WTCC.

Championship standings

Superturismo Championship
Italian Superturismo Championship